Whitman Park is a neighborhood in Camden, New Jersey. Located north of Woodlynne, Whitman Park has a population of 6,574.

Whitman Park is a crime and drug-infested neighborhood. However, businesses have started to move into Whitman Park in recent years. Due to high crime and murder rates, police have installed gunshot-recording microphones in Whitman Park. In 2015, the city of Camden submitted a redevelopment plan for the neighborhood. It is home to a substantial Polish American community, centered around the St. Joseph's Church.

References

Neighborhoods in Camden, New Jersey